This is a list of bridges and other crossings of the Zambezi River. Locations are listed with the left bank (moving downriver) listed first.

Crossings

References 

.
.